Crollon is a commune in the Manche department in Normandy in north-western France. It had 283 inhabitants as of 2014. Historically, Crollon has ranged in size from a maximum of 500 inhabitants in 1821 to a minimum of 183 in 1982. Christian Pacilly became mayor of Crollon in 2008, replacing Arsène Bouteloup, who had been mayor for the previous 32 years.

See also
Communes of the Manche department

References

External links 

 Detailed statistics about the population of Crollon from the 2014 census

Communes of Manche